is a Japanese tactical role-playing visual novel developed by Aquaplus, which first released in September 2015 for the PlayStation 3, PlayStation 4 and PlayStation Vita. Utawarerumono: Mask of Deception is the second game in the Utawarerumono series.

An English version of Utawarerumono: Mask of Deception was published on May 23, 2017, by Atlus USA in North America and by Deep Silver in Europe. An anime adaptation of Utawarerumono: Mask of Deception aired between October 2015 and March 2016.

See also
Utawarerumono
Utawarerumono: Mask of Truth

References

2015 video games
PlayStation Vita games
PlayStation 4 games
PlayStation 3 games
Tactical role-playing video games
Video games developed in Japan
Windows games
Deep Silver games
Aquaplus games